Belkis and Belkıs and Belkız are feminine given names and may refer to:

 Belkıs Akkale (born 1956), Turkish singer
 Belkis Ayón (1967–1999), Cuban artist
 Belkis Cuza Malé (born 1942), Cuban-American writer
 Belkıs Zehra Kaya (born 1984), Turkish judoka
 Belkis Leal (born 1940), Venezuelan fencer
 Belkis Rodríguez (born 1965), Cuban retired tennis player
 Belkıs Sevket, first Turkish woman to fly
 Belkis Ulacio, Venezuelan politician

 Belkis, Regina di Saba, a ballet about the Queen of Sheba composed by Ottorino Respighi

Turkish feminine given names